Rowsley is a civil parish in the Derbyshire Dales district of Derbyshire, England.  The parish contains 22 listed buildings that are recorded in the National Heritage List for England. Of these, three are listed at Grade II*, the middle of the three grades, and the others are at Grade II, the lowest grade.  The parish contains the village of Rowsley and the surrounding area.  All the listed buildings are in the village, and include houses and cottages, a church and associated structures, a road bridge, a railway viaduct, embankment and bridge, a hotel and its former stables, a former toll house, a school, a drinking fountain, a former railway station, a lamp standard, a water-powered flour mill, and a war memorial.

Key

Buildings

References

Citations

Sources

 

Lists of listed buildings in Derbyshire